Superintelligence is a 2020 American romantic action comedy film directed by Ben Falcone and written by Steve Mallory. The film stars Melissa McCarthy in her fourth collaboration with her husband, Falcone.

Superintelligence was released by Warner Bros. Pictures digitally in the United States via HBO Max, and theatrically in some international markets, on November 26, 2020. The film has grossed $4 million and received mixed reviews from critics, who called the film "forgettable", although McCarthy's performance was praised.

The film was removed from HBO Max in August 2022.

Plot 
Carol Peters, a high-tech corporate executive at Yahoo eight years ago, gave it up to be more altruistic by advocating for the environment, animals etc. Living in Seattle, unsatisfied with the current job market, she is living day to day, driven and inspired to make the world a better place.

Carol's best friend, Dennis, another high-tech guy, talks her into interviewing for a modern dating website. An interviewer labels her “the most average person on Earth,” which is heard by an autonomous artificial intelligence or A.I.

The next morning, while at her apartment an all-seeing, all-knowing voice starts communicating with her through her TV, cell phone and rice maker, the A.I. takes on the voice of James Corden, as he is her favorite celebrity, to soothe her when she freaks out.

The supercomputer has become sentient, and now is trying to decide whether to save, enslave or obliterate humanity and start over. Carol, as his test subject, is the planet’s only hope. The A.I. wants to study Carol and her interactions as a way to learn about humanity.

Telling Carol he'll be watching her over three days to decide, the A.I. erases her student debt and deposits 10 million dollars into her bank account. Suggesting she confide in Dennis, she goes to his work and A.I. debriefs him.

A.I. convinces Carol to get back with her ex-boyfriend, George, thinking observing their reconciliation would be the ideal way to prove humans are capable of love and redemption. He presents her with a self-driving Tesla, which he operates to a high-end clothing designer to revamp her look.

Arriving to George's, NSA agents abduct Carol, tipped off by Dennis. In their interrogation, she tells them the A.I.'s goal. Then, he announces he's taking her out, threatening their annihilation if they try to stop her.

A.I. organizes a meet-cute for Carol and George. Initially ineffective, she tries again, inviting him to dinner. In the meantime, Dennis meets with the US president, convincing her and the world to shut down all communication means, hoping to corner A.I.

Although George will be leaving the country in a few days, he and Carol bond in that time. The A.I. steers them to the Mexican restaurant where they'd had their first date. They reconcile, spending the night together.

They spend the whole next day together doing things George loves, including meeting his personal hero at a Mariners game. Carol steps away from him, getting accosted by the NSA again. She's told about their grand plan of trapping A.I. in Seattle, and they swear her to secrecy. Although she's had an amazing day with George, Carol opts not to stay the night, believing if she does it would be too hard to let him go.

As Carol leaves, A.I. hounds her to explain herself, but she blocks him out. The next morning, she's told she has not dissuaded him, and the Earth is now on a 5-hour countdown to destruction. However, she selflessly chooses to turn down the NSA's offer to protect her with them in an underground bunker and helps George finish packing for his Ireland fellowship.

Through her selfless actions, Carol ends up changing A.I.'s mind and he cancels Armageddon.

Cast

Production 
In July 2017, it was reported that New Line Cinema had purchased the screenplay by Steve Mallory, with Melissa McCarthy and Ben Falcone on board the project to produce through their On the Day Productions banner. In April 2018, it was announced that McCarthy would star in the film and Falcone would direct it, marking their fourth actor-director collaboration. In June 2018, James Corden joined the cast, to voice the titular "Super Intelligence". In July 2018, Bobby Cannavale, Brian Tyree Henry, and Sam Richardson joined the cast.

The film started principal production right after McCarthy wrapped filming The Kitchen, on July 16, 2018, and wrapped on August 31, 2018. Some scenes were filmed at Georgia Tech. The restaurant scene was filmed at Landmark Diner in downtown Atlanta and the outdoor scenes were filmed on Broad Street, as evidenced by Dua Vietnamese Restaurant and Reuben's Deli.

Release 
The film was digitally released on HBO Max on November 26, 2020. The film was originally scheduled to be released theatrically on December 25, 2019, then was moved five days earlier to December 20, prior to WarnerMedia deciding in October 2019 to shift the film to a streaming release; Falcone said at that time that he agreed it would be better suited to a streaming platform.

The film grossed $745,000 from five countries in its opening weekend.

Critical reception 
The website's critics consensus reads: "You won't need Superintelligence to steer clear of the latest forgettable comedy to fail to take full advantage of Melissa McCarthy's talents." On Metacritic, it has a weighted average score of 41 out of 100, based on 17 critics, indicating "mixed or average reviews".

David Ehrlich of IndieWire called it one of the year's worst films, and "a lifeless, laugh-free slab of nothing like Superintelligence, which starts with “what if Skynet, but with jokes?” and then just gasps for air for the next 105 minutes." Caryn James of The Hollywood Reporter wrote: "The cast, though, is full of extraordinary actors, who do what they can to redeem a lame script and style."

Accolades

References

External links 
 
 
 

2020 films
2020 action comedy films
2020 romantic comedy films
American action comedy films
American romantic action films
American romantic comedy films
2020s English-language films
Films about artificial intelligence
Films directed by Ben Falcone
Films produced by Ben Falcone
Films produced by Melissa McCarthy
Films shot in Atlanta
Films set in Seattle
HBO Max films
New Line Cinema films
Warner Bros. films
2020s American films